This is a list of articles  relating to fossil trackways that are outside the category of the numerous fossil dinosaur articles – that refer to tracks or trackways.

List of non-Dinosauria fossil trackway articles
Archaeotherium
Arthropleura
Chirotherium; (only a related species known)
Climactichnites
Cruziana
Dromornithidae
Eurypterid
Hibbertopterus
Laetoli
Laetoli footprints
Pterosaur
Tetrapod
Trace fossil
Trilobite

Location, site articles

Chuckanut Formation
Coconino Sandstone
Ipolytarnóc
Minas Basin; "fish-fin" trackway
Valentia Island

See also
Protichnites
Trace fossil

Paleontology lists